Limestone Ridges is a rural locality in the Scenic Rim Region, Queensland, Australia.

Geography
The Ipswich Boonah Road marks the eastern boundary of the locality.

Ipswich – Boonah Road (State Route 93) runs along the eastern boundary.

History
The name Limestone Ridges refers from an outcrop now mined for dolomite.

Limestone Ridges Provisional School opened on 11 November 1884. On 1 April 1910, it became Limestone Ridges State School. It closed on 3 May 1974. It was at 335 Limestone Ridges Road.

The locality contains 41 households, in which 51.7% of the population are males and 48.3% of the population are females with a median age of 45, 7 years above the national average. The average weekly household income is $1,437, $1 below the national average.

References 

Scenic Rim Region
Localities in Queensland